Jumgal Too is a mountain range in internal Tian Shan in Kyrgyz Republic. It is part of Jumgal mountain system which includes also ranges Sandyk, Kara Moynok, Kindik, and Oy Kaiyn. It lies north of the Jumgal valley. The length of the range is 54 km, width - 15 km, and height up to 4121m.

References

Mountain ranges of Kyrgyzstan
Naryn Region
Mountain ranges of the Tian Shan